Krishan Kumar Dua is an Indian actor and producer. He is best known for Bewafa Sanam (1995) and owning the largest music producing company in India, T-Series.

Personal life
He was born Krishan Kumar Dua in a Punjabi family, the son of fruit seller Chandrabhan who had migrated to Delhi after the partition of India. He was the younger brother of Gulshan Kumar, founder of Super Cassettes Industries/T-Series. Kumar has a daughter, Tishaa Kumar, with actress Tanya Singh - the daughter of composer of Ajit Singh and sister of actress Nattasha Singh.

Filmography

As actor

As producer

References

External links

Indian male film actors
Hindi film producers
Living people
Year of birth missing (living people)
Punjabi Hindus